Lee Su-ji (born March 20, 1998), also known mononymously as Suji and Halla, is a South Korean singer and actress. She debuted as a member of the South Korean girl group The Ark and later was a member of the project girl group UNI.T. She was also a member of Real Girls Project as part of her acting role in The Idolmaster KR.

Early life and education 
Lee Su-ji was born on March 20, 1998 in Busan, South Korea. She grew up in Daegu, South Korea. She attended Hanlim Multi Art School learning Broadcasting & Entertainment Department in Seoul and graduated on 10 February 2017. She joined Music K Entertainment in 2013 and trained for two years.

Career 
In 2014, Lee appeared in the music video of labelmate Hong Jin-young's song "Cheer Up". On April 12, 2015, she debuted as a member of Music K Entertainment's new girl group The Ark under the stage name "Halla". The group released one single, "The Light", before going on hiatus. In March 2016, it was unofficially announced that the group had disbanded a month before. On April 26, 2016, Lee joined the auditions for The Idolmaster KR, a Korean drama loosely based on the Japanese raising simulation and rhythm video game series The Idolmaster, where she played the main lead and her twin sister. On August 25, she debuted as a member of girl group Real Girls Project, which was formed for the drama. On November 4, 2017, Lee joined The Unit: Idol Rebooting Project. She won a final spot on Top 9 and became a part of the group called UNI.T.

Discography

Filmography

Television drama

Television shows

Hosting

References

External links 

Living people
MBK Entertainment artists
1998 births
South Korean women pop singers
South Korean female idols
K-pop singers
South Korean television actresses
Hanlim Multi Art School alumni
Uni.T members
21st-century South Korean women singers